František Kmenta (born 5 October 1958) is a retired Czech race walker.

He competed at the IAAF World Race Walking Cup in 1997 and 1999, but finished lowly. He became Czech champion in 2001 (50 km).

References

1958 births
Living people
Czech male racewalkers
Place of birth missing (living people)